Beaverton Aerodrome  is a registered aerodrome located  east of Beaverton, Ontario, Canada.

References

Registered aerodromes in Ontario